Tachinisca is a genus of Tephritid or fruit flies in the family Tephritidae.

References

Tachiniscinae
Tephritidae genera